Bartniki may refer to the following places in Poland:
Bartniki, Milicz County in Lower Silesian Voivodeship (south-west Poland)
Bartniki, Podlaskie Voivodeship (north-east Poland)
Bartniki, Przasnysz County in Masovian Voivodeship (east-central Poland)
Bartniki, Żyrardów County in Masovian Voivodeship (east-central Poland)
Bartniki, Warmian-Masurian Voivodeship (north Poland)